Since 1980 English singer-songwriter Martin Newell has been releasing music as The Cleaners from Venus, The Brotherhood of Lizards, The Stray Trolleys, and also under his own name.

Studio albums

Live albums

Compilation albums

Video albums

EPs

Singles

Box sets

External links
The Cleaners from Venus on Bandcamp
Martin Newell partial discography

Martin Newell (musician) albums
Newell, Martin